Patricia D. "Pat" Scott ( died January 7, 2001) was an American politician who served as a member of the Washington House of Representatives from 1984 to 2001.  First appointed to office upon the resignation of John Martinis, she represented Washington's 28th legislative district as a Democrat for 17 years until her death in 2001.

Her death, along with the surprise resignation of Republican Renee Radcliff, set up two special elections for seats in Snohomish County.  Democrats won both seats, breaking a tie in the chamber and resulting in a 50-48 Democratic majority that elected Frank Chopp as sole Speaker of the House.

References

Further reading
 Ray Moore: An Oral History, interviewed by Sharon Boswell, Washington State Oral History Program, Office of the Secretary of State, 1999.

2001 deaths

Democratic Party members of the Washington House of Representatives
Women state legislators in Washington (state)